The Tennessee State Lady Tigers basketball team represents Tennessee State University (TSU) in women's basketball in Nashville, Tennessee. The school's team currently competes in the Ohio Valley Conference. They play their home games at the Gentry Complex.

History
Tennessee State began play in 1977. The Lady Tigers joined the OVC in 1987. They have an all-time record (as of the end of the 2015–16 season) of 356–566.

NCAA tournament results

References

External links